The 2019 AFL Women's draft consisted of the various periods when the 14 clubs in the AFL Women's competition can recruit players prior to the competition's 2020 season.

At the conclusion of the period clubs were required to have 27 senior-listed and three rookie-listed players.

Expansion club signing period

First period
A maximum of seven of these players could be open-age signings who had nominated for the 2018 AFL Women's draft but not been selected. A final three spots were reserved for three junior players of minimum draft age (born in 2001) and who hailed from the clubs' designated development regions.

Second period
These clubs can sign a maximum of 12 players each through this mechanism. No compensation will be offered to those clubs losing players under this process, but the player's existing club are permitted to negotiate to re-sign the player. Players can be signed under this mechanism to one or two year contracts.

Signing and trading period 
Concurrently to the expansion club signing period, all 14 clubs were able to sign and trade players. Players can be signed during this period are eligible for one or two year contracts. A second stage to the trade period will open from 23 April and run until 26 April, with only the 10 established clubs able to take part.

Trades

Retirements and delistings

Free agency 
A free agency period was held between the end of the trading and signing period on April 26 and until April 30 in which clubs were permitted to sign delisted or uncontracted players. At the conclusion of the period, clubs are permitted to have retained no more than 22 senior players and two rookies. Team lists matching those requirements must be submitted on May 3.

Rookie signings 
In the absence of a rookie draft, each club was required to sign two rookie players, either new or retained from their rookie list the year prior. New players to this list must not have played Australian rules football within the previous three years or been involved in an AFLW high-performance program.

Draft 
A draft was held on October 22, 2019. Players nominated for a single selection pool, aligned to a state or metropolitan region, with players only being eligible to be drafted by clubs operating in that region. An indicative draft order was published in early April while the final draft order was published by the AFL in the wake of the expansion signing period on 23 April.

Post-Draft

Undrafted free agency 
A final free agency period opened after the conclusion of the draft, allowing clubs that passed on a draft selection to recruit from outside their state-based zone.

Train-on list
Before the opening round of the season, clubs were permitted to replace players who had suffered a long-term injury or for whom personal circumstances had ruled them out for playing in any match that year. The replacement players are signed to a train-on list and are considered semi-eligible for section. Though they are eligible to train with the club, they cannot be selected for match play until further injuries to player on the club's list mean a club has fewer than 23 players available for any single match.

Note:  was given special permission to treat Saad as a full signing.

See also 
 2019 AFL draft

References 

AFL Women's draft
Draft
AFL Women's draft
2010s in Melbourne
Australian rules football in Victoria (Australia)
Sport in Melbourne
Events in Melbourne